Richland Township is one of the twelve townships of Vinton County, Ohio, United States.  The 2010 census found 1,748 people in the township.

Geography
Located in the western part of the county, it borders the following townships:
Jackson Township: north
Elk Township: east
Clinton Township: southeast
Washington Township, Jackson County: south
Jackson Township, Jackson County: southwest
Harrison Township: west
Eagle Township: northwest corner

No municipalities are located in Richland Township.

Name and history
Richland Township was organized in about 1824.

It is one of twelve Richland Townships statewide.

Government
The township is governed by a three-member board of trustees, who are elected in November of odd-numbered years to a four-year term beginning on the following January 1. Two are elected in the year after the presidential election and one is elected in the year before it. There is also an elected township fiscal officer, who serves a four-year term beginning on April 1 of the year after the election, which is held in November of the year before the presidential election. Vacancies in the fiscal officership or on the board of trustees are filled by the remaining trustees.

References

External links
Vinton County Chamber of Commerce 

Townships in Vinton County, Ohio
Townships in Ohio